Lycée Charles de Gaulle may refer to:

In France:
 , Dijon
 Lycée Charles de Gaulle (Paris)
 Lycée Charles de Gaulle (Poissy) (Paris area)
 Lycée Charles de Gaulle (Rosny-sous-Bois) (Paris area)

Schools outside France:
 Lycée Français Charles de Gaulle in London
 Lycée Français Charles de Gaulle, Ankara, Turkey
 Lycée Français Charles de Gaulle (Central African Republic), Bangui, Central African Republic
 Lycée Français Charles de Gaulle (Chile), Concepción, Chile
 Lycée Charles de Gaulle (Syria), Damascus, Syria
 Lycée Français International Charles de Gaulle de Pékin, Beijing, China